HRT Plus was a Croatian satellite channel owned by the public service broadcaster, HRT.
The channel was available via Hot Bird, cable and Max TV, in Croatia and parts of Europe,  America, and Australia.

History
Before the launch of HRT Plus on 29 March 2004, HRT 3 provided sports programming since 7 November 1994 until 28 March 2004. The next day, HRT Plus was launched, with the HRT 3 frequency denationalized and transferred to RTL Croatia.

Programmes
HRT Plus usually aired HRT's archive programme from the Comedy,  Cinema, News, History, Home, Food, Life, Morning Program at 1930s,1940s , 1950s,  1960s, 1970s, 1980s, 1990s. Sometimes it broadcast sports. HRT 3 relaunched on 15 September 2012, with HRT Plus closing two days earlier, forwarding its frequency.

External links
Official HRT website
HRT programme

Defunct television channels in Croatia
Mass media in Zagreb
Television channels and stations established in 2004
Television channels and stations disestablished in 2012
2004 establishments in Croatia
2012 disestablishments in Croatia